Naemi Brändle (born 20 June 2001) is a Swiss slalom canoeist who has competed at the international level since 2016. She is from Wagenhausen, Thurgau.

Naemi won a bronze medal in the K1 event at the 2018 Junior World Championships in Ivrea. She earned her best senior world championship result of 55th at the 2019 event in La Seu d'Urgell.

Brändle finished 9th at the 2021 European Championships in Ivrea, earning an Olympic quota for Switzerland and herself. Naemi represented Switzerland in the K1 event at the 2020 Summer Olympics in Tokyo, finishing in 18th place.

References

External links 

 

2001 births
Living people
Swiss female canoeists
Olympic canoeists of Switzerland
Canoeists at the 2020 Summer Olympics